Carl-Erik Quensel (9 October 1907 – 10 April 1977) was a Swedish statistician and demographer, specializing in population statistics,  statistical distribution theory and biostatistics.

Biography

Early life
Carl-Erik Quensel was born in Malmö, Sweden on 9 October 1907, the son of Conrad and Ester Quensel. 
.

Scientific career
In 1935 Qunsel earned a licentiate degree from the Department of Statistics at Lund University, followed by a PhD degree in 1938. In 1941, he was appointed professor of Statistics at Lund University
. Quensel was an elected member of the International Statistical Institute. He served as a Swedish delegate to the United Nations Population committee.

Major scientific work

A Method of Determining the Regression Curve When the Marginal Distribution is of the Normal Logarithmic Type, Annals of Mathematical Statistics, 7:196-201, 1936.

Second moment and of the Correlation Coefficient in Samples from Populations of Type A, The Statistical Institute at the University of Lund. Lund, C. W. K. Gleerup/Leipzig, Otto Harrassowitz, 1938.

Lärobok i den teoretiska statistikens grunder, Lund 1944.

Befolkningsframskrivningar för Hälsingborgs stad 1945 – 1975, Lund, 1949.

Studenternas utbildningsval, tillsammans med Bo Israelsson, Lund, 1958.

References

Sources

External links

Swedish statisticians
Academic staff of Lund University
Lund University alumni
Elected Members of the International Statistical Institute
1907 births
1977 deaths